The Audie Award for Thriller or Suspense is one of the Audie Awards presented annually by the Audio Publishers Association (APA). It awards excellence in narration, production, and content for a thriller or suspense audiobook released in a given year. It has been awarded since 2007.

Winners and finalists

2000s

2010s

2020s

References

External links 

 Audie Award winners
 Audie Awards official website

Thriller or Suspense
Awards established in 2007
English-language literary awards